Werner Pinzner (27 April 1947 – 29 July 1986), also called "Mucki", was a German contract killer who became known as the "St. Pauli Killer". After a series of contract killings, he fatally shot the investigating public prosecutor during interrogation and then his own wife and himself at the Hamburg police headquarters in 1986. The case had political consequences in the city of Hamburg and is considered one of the most "spectacular" cases in the criminal history of the Federal Republic of Germany.

Early life 
Werner Pinzner was born on 27 April 1947 in Bramfeld, the son of a radio mechanic and a grocery chain store manager. After dropping out of school without a degree, he went to sea with the International Christian Maritime Association for two years in 1964. In 1966 he worked as a driver for a few weeks and then briefly went to sea again. He attempted to become a regular soldier in the German Armed Forces but failed due to previous convictions. Shortly after, he met his first wife. In 1970, he was sentenced to a short term of imprisonment for the first time, and his daughter was born the following year. After her birth, Pinzner worked as a scaffolder, tiler and butcher. In August 1975, he took part in a robbery at a supermarket, where one of the perpetrators shot the store manager.
 
Pinzner was arrested in September 1975 and sentenced to ten years in prison. Before he was sentenced, he met his second wife. He served nine years of sentence in Fuhlsbüttel prison; then moved to Vierlande open prison. During his stay in prison, he met people of some importance in the red-light district of Hamburg. Pinzner also came into contact with drugs. Pinzner was able to buy a .38 Special calibre Arminius revolver and store it in his locker in prison, which the Hamburg penal system offered every inmate in an open prison and which was never searched.
 
In June 1984, while he was on day release, he took part in a robbery with two accomplices from the red-light district and committed his first contract killing the following month, even before his release. In July 1984, he was released from the open prison.

Assassinations 

Pinzner worked as a contract killer in the red-light district. He committed crimes nationwide, but essentially these were related to clashes in the red-light district of St. Pauli, Hamburg. Pinzner's primary client was a pimp nicknamed "Wiener Peter".

Hamburger Kiez at the time of Pinzner's murders 
The pimps of Hamburg's red-light district operated brothels in Hamburg and nationwide. However, prostitution experienced a significant decline in the 1980s as fears of HIV infection increased. At the same time, foreigners began to spread in the red-light districts alongside German pimps. The pimps initially reacted with more brutal methods of exploiting the prostitutes. However, drug trafficking also increased, as did other illegal activities such as arms dealing or possession of stolen goods, to the source of income. In addition to the expansion to other business areas, there were increased disputes about prostitution and drug trafficking. The contract killings committed by Pinzner were part of these violent clashes.
 
In St. Pauli, particularly along Herbertstraße and at the Reeperbahn, two groups of pimps had formed, vying for influence: the more established so-called  and the emerging . The Hells Angels, used by both groups for henchman services, also played a certain role as debt collectors. The GMBH was finally gradually pushed out by a group around "Wiener Peter", who later became Pinzner's main client.

The individual assassinations

Yehuda Arzi 
Yehuda Arzi, or Hans Jenö Müller, was a former brothel owner who used his mother's past as a brothel owner to blackmail his former wife and daughter. He was also involved in an unpaid cocaine deal which forced him to run away from his wife and business partners in an apartment in Kiel.
 
Mediated by the "Wiener Peter", Arzi's ex-wife and daughter first asked Pinzner to cut off one of Arzi's fingers to intimidate him; however, later, they asked Pinzner to kill Arzi. He stated that he would kill Arzi for DM 40,000 (equivalent to €20,090 in 2021). On behalf of his ex-wife and daughter, Pinzner finally went to Kiel with an accomplice, Hockauf, and shot Arzi in his apartment on 7 July 1984. Although the former wife and daughter were identified relatively quickly as suspects, the proceedings against the two were initially discontinued due to a lack of evidence. After the crime, Pinzner returned to the open Vierlande Prison prison, where he deposited the weapon back in his locker.

Peter Pfeilmaier 
Peter Pfeilmaier, called "Bayern Peter", was a partner in the brothel of "Hammer Deich" and the "MB Club". The club served illegal gambling, the use of cocaine by members, and drug trafficking. Pfeilmaier became an economic risk for his partner due to his increasing cocaine consumption and business-damaging behaviour in the brothel. The partner offered "Wiener Peter" a stake in Pfeilmaier's place.
 
Pinzner was commissioned to assassinate Pfeilmaier. He was to receive DM 15,000 (equivalent to €7,530 in 2021) from each of the two new partners and a share in a brothel. Instead, with the help of an accomplice, Pinzner lured Pfeilmaier, promising a larger drug deal to be carried out in a quiet place. He went with the accomplice and the victim on 12 September 1984 in his car to a garage complex at Hirsekamp in Hamburg, Bramfeld, where Pfeilmaier was shot in the head.
 
However, Pinzner did not receive the promised participation in the brothel; rather, he was to work as a collector at the "Hammer Deich". His accomplice kept part of the promised money.

Dietmar Traub 
Dietmar "Lackschuh" Traub ran the Palais d'Amour brothel together with "Wiener Peter". Due to his high cocaine consumption, Traub also became a burden for his partner. In addition, he wanted to withdraw from his involvement in the brothel in exchange for a compensation payment of DM 100,000 (equivalent to €50,230 in 2021) and to run drug deals independently of his partner. However, Traub stayed away from the neighbourhood more and more.
 
In November 1984, Traub went to Munich to check on a prostitute. Pinzner followed him with an accomplice who had just been released from prison. The two stopped in Heilbronn, where they obtained an alibi from a brothel known as the "Chief of Heilbronn". Then they went to Munich. As with Pfeilmaier, the later victim was offered a fictitious drug deal. Traub agreed. The three went to the Hohenbrunn forest in a rental car. Pinzner and his accomplice faked a car breakdown and shot Traub after he got out.

Waldemar Dammer and Ralf Kühne 
Waldemar Dammer, known as "Neger [German for Negro] Waldi", ran two brothels in competition with "Wiener Peter". Shortly before Easter 1985, Dammer had "Wiener Peter" beaten up by two of his thugs in his "Palais d'Amour" brothel, thereby publicly humiliating him. Pinzner and an accomplice were commissioned to kill Dammer and his two thugs for a flat fee of DM 60,000 (equivalent to €30,140 in 2021). Pinzner assumed Dammer would meet with the thugs at his home in the bourgeoisie Schnelsen. So he and his accomplice went to Dammer's house on Easter Monday and were let in. Dammer and his manager Ralf Kühne were shot there, but not the thugs.
 
Although Pinzner later confessed to these murders, it was possible to use the weapons to prove that his accomplice, rather than himself, had shot the two men.

Investigations, arrest and suicide 
In connection with allegations – which were ultimately not confirmed – that high-ranking police officers were working with pimps, an investigation group against organised crime, Fachdirektion 65 (or Department 65), was set up under Interior Senator Alfons Pawelczyk at the end of the 1970s. It was the first such agency to combat organised crime in Germany. This police unit worked with informants and wiretapping methods, among other things. They were also shielded internally by the police. They succeeded in getting a well-known brotheller, who was called the "Godfather of St. Pauli", to face tax evasion charges. In addition, Fachdirektion 65 achieved successes against the GMBH, the Nutella gang, and the Hells Angels.
 
While the .38 calibre used by Pinzner represents a very common projectile diameter, the projectiles of the gun Pinzner used had a distinctive feature: Pinzner's revolver was a "ten rifling with a right-hand twist" gun, a very rare feature. From this peculiarity and the fact that the murders involved people connected to the pimp milieu of St. Pauli, it could be concluded that this was an independent series of murders. Only in the case of Yehuda Arzi were the references to St. Pauli initially not recognisable, and the double murder of Dammer and Kühne only showed parallels in the execution of the crime. Still, it was carried out with a different weapon.
 
Because of the similarities between the deaths, a special commission (SoKo) was formed under the leadership of Fachdirektion 65. The results of the undercover investigations were systematically compiled, and the potential witnesses were questioned. Finally, when two prostitutes made official statements, a  arrested Pinzner on 15 April 1986, the "Wiener Peter" and an accomplice. "On the killer's sofa lay the murder weapon, a loaded Arminius revolver, .38 calibre, ten riflings with a right-hand twist."

Arrest 
After the arrest, which was only on suspicion of murdering "Bayern Peter" Pfeilmaier, Pinzner immediately demanded to speak to the investigating public prosecutor, Wolfgang Bistry. During the first interrogation, Pinzner testified that he had committed eight murders. He later told the prosecutor that he had killed eleven people and was ready to testify. The condition should be that he could spend another two days (48 hours) undisturbed with his wife, Jutta. The prosecutor's response was vague and said they would see what was possible. According to entries in his diary, Pinzner probably took this as a promise. As a result, Pinzner was to provide specific information on five murders in several interrogations and testify on the structures in the red-light district of St. Pauli.
 
The motive for his actions was that he wanted to participate in the prostitution business. However, he did not succeed because he was feared as a contract killer but not accepted as part of the red-light milieu. Concurrently, there were plans to have Pinzner murdered as an accomplice. A bounty of DM 300,000 (equivalent to €150,680 in 2021) is said to have been placed on his head when he spoke to the public prosecutor in custody.

Press 
At a press conference, Hamburg Senator for the Interior, Rolf Lange (SPD), described the arrest of Pinzner and the other participants as a great success for Fachdirektion 65 in the fight against organised crime. On the day of Pinzner's arrest, Pinzner's lawyer and the reporter Thomas Reinecke agreed that, for a payment of DM 35,000 (equivalent to €17,580 in 2021), Pinzner, his lawyer and Pinzner's wife would communicate with the press only through Reinecke. Reinecke, in turn, sold these exclusive rights to Stern magazine for DM 50,000 (equivalent to €25,110 in 2021).
 
The journalist Thomas Osterkorn could obtain private pictures and notes of Pinzner that Pinzner's neighbours had found in Pinzner's attic, which the police had not searched. Osterkorn began his career at Stern based on this material. Bunte printed letters from Pinzner to his wife. The Bild newspaper was initially unable to keep up with this information, but "reciprocated" with a headline defaming the lawyer.

Murder-suicide on 29 July 1986 

On 29 July 1986, Pinzner was taken to the Hamburg police headquarters, which was then located in a high-rise building at the Berliner Tor, for questioning. Present were Pinzner, Pinzner's wife Jutta, his lawyer Isolde Oechsle-Misfeld, two police officers, a typist to record the statement, and the public prosecutor Wolfgang Bistry. With the help of the lawyer, Pinzner's wife had smuggled a firearm into the headquarters. Pinzner seized it and fatally shot the prosecutor. The police officers were able to leave the room. Pinzner barricaded the door, phoned his daughter, and fatally shot his wife and then himself.

Aftermath 
Including the incident of 29 July 1986, Pinzner was responsible for the killing of 13 people, including his wife Jutta and Wolfgang Bistry. His final resting place is at the Burgtor Cemetery in Lübeck. 

The murder weapon is exhibited at Hamburg Police Museum.

Police 
Extensive investigations followed to catch the suspected backers of the crime; so the police searched the attorney's office. In December 1986, around 350 police officers and several public prosecutors simultaneously carried out a major raid in Hamburg, Ahrensburg, Braunschweig and Mallorca. There were multiple arrests. The brothel owner , known as "Ringo", who was suspected of being behind the murder of prosecutor Bistry, escaped over the rooftops and left Germany for Costa Rica, from where he was extradited after considerable diplomatic efforts.

Press 
After Pinzner's death, a censor was imposed on the press for the first time since the kidnapping and murder of Hanns Martin Schleyer, but this only fuelled speculation in the press. The judicial scandal intensified when it finally became known that cocaine and puncture marks were found on Pinzner's body, and paraphernalia for heroin consumption had been found in Pinzner's cell.
 
The contract killings and the double murder followed by suicide attracted considerable public attention. Because of the popularity of the case, its documentation became an important part of an exhibition of the best-known criminal cases in Hamburg's criminal history. Pinzner was part of an NDR series on major criminal cases in the Hanseatic city; the ARD dealt with the series "The major criminal cases" in 2002 with the case. ZDF also addressed the series of murders in 2016 in the documentary Murder without Conscience: The St. Pauli Killer in the series Enlightened – Spectacular Criminal Cases. The Pinzner case was presented at the exhibition A Police Museum for Hamburg in 2007 alongside other Hamburg criminal cases – such as the serial murders Fritz Honkas or the department store blackmailer "Dagobert", and in the Hamburg Police Museum. It is also the subject of guided tours through St. Pauli. In 2011, the Norddeutscher Rundfunk took the 25th anniversary of the crime at the police headquarters on 29 July 1986 as an opportunity for renewed documentation.

Politics 
In connection with the Pinzner case, there was a judicial scandal because of the insufficient security precautions in Hamburg prisons and because the investigating authorities were too accommodating towards Pinzner. Werner Pinzner had also been supplied with drugs, indicating significant safety deficiencies. Independent of Pinzner's actions, the Interior and Justice Senators were politically shaken.  (SPD), the senator for justice, was publicly criticised because of the penal system she represented, the interior senator  (SPD) because of the so-called , but both also because of the public concern about the increase of crime. In addition, given the approaching elections to the Hamburg Parliament on 9 November 1986, the previously governing Social Democratic government was in danger of losing the election as a result of the scandal. Because of the criminal case, the two senators resigned on 6 August 1986. The polls in June 1986 were still pointing to a clear victory for the Social Democratic Party of Germany (SPD). Still. they indicated that the debate about internal security caused by the incident in the police headquarters had led to a heavy loss of votes in the election for the SPD. The SPD (41.7%) was the second strongest behind the CDU (41.9%). Since there was no coalition agreement; as a result, the so-called "Hamburg conditions" occurred with an SPD minority senate with changing majorities.
 
The case brought the topic of organised crime into the political debate.
 
To prevent similar incidents, security gates were installed at the entrances to the police headquarters, and they are still in place. The general control of the Hamburg judicial authorities, initially directed against all criminal defence lawyers, after Bistry's murder met with considerable resistance from the Hamburg Bar Association, the Hamburg Criminal Defense Lawyers' Working Group and the Republican Lawyers' Association.

Arrests 
Charges were brought against Pinzner's lawyer and three of his clients. These trials also attracted a great deal of media interest. At the trial against the lawyer, the court-appointed an expert, Herbert Maisch, who testified that the lawyer had become so entangled in the case processing due to severe developmental disorders in his childhood and adolescence that she was no longer able to free herself from it. She eventually received six-and-a-half years in prison for being an accessory to murder, and she lost her licence for five years. In 1989, two of Pinzner's accomplices, Armin Hockauf and Siegfried Träger, and "Wiener Peter" received a life sentence. The latter was expelled to Austria in February 2000 after serving 14 years.
 
In addition to the criminal proceedings, the judiciary repeatedly dealt with the consequences of Pinzner's actions in terms of the press law. For example, Der Spiegel had to print a half-page reply after reports about an alleged man behind the murders. In 1994, the  prohibited the journalist Dagobert Lindlau from naming Pinzner's lawyer in his book Der Lohnkiller for reasons of social rehabilitation.

In popular culture 
The events surrounding Werner Pinzner were seen as material for a screenplay soon after the suicide. In the decade that followed the murders, detective novels and films picked up on the subject matter of the "St. Pauli Killer".  dealt with the case in his St. Pauli trilogy, and Dagobert Lindlau, in his 1994 book, The Hire Killer an organised crime figure.

References

External links 

 
 

1986 crimes in Germany
1947 births
1986 deaths
Criminals from Hamburg
Contract killers
Suicides by firearm
German people convicted of murder
German people convicted of murdering police officers
German serial killers
Male serial killers
Murder–suicides in Germany